Danilo Ángel Astori Saragosa (born April 23, 1940) is a Uruguayan retired social democratic politician who served as the 15th vice president of Uruguay from 2010 to 2015 under President José Mujica. A member of Uruguay Assembly–Broad Front, he also served as Minister of Economy and Finance from 2005 to 2008 and from 2015 to 2020, and as Senator of the Republic from 1990 to 2005.

Astori was born and raised in Montevideo. He completed his primary and secondary studies at the Liceo y Colegio Maturana located in barrio Bella Vista. In 1958 he enrolled in the Faculty of Economics of the University of the Republic, and in 1963 he graduated as a public accountant and economist. After graduating, he began working with the then deputy minister of livestock and leader of the National Party, Wilson Ferreira Aldunate. He served as a professor at the Faculty of Economics of the University of the Republic, of which he was named dean in 1973, being the youngest person to hold the position. Since 1983, during the civic-military dictatorship, he conducted a radio audition entitled "Análisis Económicos". He also dabbled in written journalism, participating in the weeklies Aquí and Brecha.

Political career
At the age of 23, he began working with Wilson Ferreira Aldunate, being in charge of the Office of Agricultural Policy and Programming (OPYPA), while Ferreira Aldunate was vice minister of the Ministry of Livestock and Agriculture. The founding of OPYPA was part of the establishment of the indicative planning process in Uruguay and, among other products, generated the first National Plan for Agricultural Development. 

In 1989 he ran for Vice President of the Republic, as Líber Seregni's running mate, finishing in third place with 20.35%. He was also in the first place of all the ballots for the Senate, being elected Senator of the Republic for the 43rd Legislature. In 1994 he founded Uruguay Assembly, a faction within the Broad Front, for which he was re-elected senator in the 1994 and 1999 elections. In 2005, with the inauguration of Tabaré Vázquez, the first president of the Broad Front, Astori was appointed Minister of Economy and Finance. On September 18, 2008, he resigned from the Cabinet post and returned to his Senate seat, which he had re-won in the 2004 election.

In the 2009 presidential primaries, he was a pre-candidate for the Presidency of the Republic, but was defeated by José Mujica. However, Mujica named him his running mate, and the presidential formula won the runoff of the October general election. In December 2014, after the election of Tabaré Vazquez again as president, Astori was appointed Minister of Economy and Finance.

In 2019 Astori was elected a senator for the 49th Legislature. The presidential candidate of the Broad Front Daniel Martínez proposed him as Minister of Foreign Relations in a possible government. In November 2022, he resigned from the Senate due to health problems.

Policies
Astori followed a fiscal conservative policy, but allowing increases in welfare, education and health care spending. He has been a supporter of trade pacts with the United States, the European Union, the People's Republic of China and India, with the Chilean "open regionalism" as a model.

References

External links 

 Danilo Astori's virtual office

1940 births
Living people
Uruguayan people of Italian descent
Vice presidents of Uruguay
Presidents of the Senate of Uruguay
Uruguayan vice-presidential candidates
Members of the Senate of Uruguay
Ministers of Economics and Finance of Uruguay
Politicians from Montevideo
University of the Republic (Uruguay) alumni
Academic staff of the University of the Republic (Uruguay)
Uruguayan accountants
Uruguayan economists
Uruguay Assembly politicians
Broad Front (Uruguay) politicians
Recipients of the Delmira Agustini Medal